The Shree Vinayaka Devaru  (ಇಡಗುಂಜಿ ಗಣಪತಿ) is a Hindu temple dedicated to the god Ganesha,  It is one of the tourist destination near Murudeshwara, it is located on the West Coast of India in the Idagunji town in Uttara Kannada district in Karnataka. The temple's popularity as a religious place is recorded by about 1 million devotees visiting it annually.

It is one of the six famous Ganesha temples on the west coast of India, which is also popularly called the "Ganesha Coast".

Geography
Idagunji where the temple is located is a small village on the west coast of India close to the Sharvathi River which joins the Arabian Sea. It is close to Manki, Mavinakatte and is about 14 km from Honavar,65 km from Gokarna, and 5 km from a road which branches from the National Highway 17 (India), towards the west coast. Honnavara, the capital of the taluk in which Idagunji lies, is also the nearest railway station.

Legend

The importance of the temple is attributed to a legend, occurring at the end of the Dvapara Yuga (the third Hindu epoch or era) before the onset of Kali Yuga (the present epoch or era). Every one feared the advent of Kali Yuga, as the god Krishna was about to leave earth for his divine abode at the end of Dvapara Yuga. Sages started performing austerities and prayers seeking Krishna's help to overcome all impediments of Kali Yuga. Sages led by Valakhilya started rituals in Kunjavana, a forest area on the banks of the Sharavati River in Karnataka which joins the Arabian Sea. During this period, he encountered many obstacles in performing the sacrifice and was very disturbed. He, therefore, sought the advice of the divine sage Narada, seeking suitable ways to tackle the problem. Narada advised Valakhilya to seek the blessings of Ganesha - the remover of obstacles - before restarting his sacrifice.

At the request of the sages, Narada selected a site for the rite on the banks of the River Sharavathi, at Kunjavana, seeking Ganesha's intervention. Even the Hindu Trinity (the gods Brahma, Vishnu and Shiva) had visited this place in the past to bring an end to the demons who were involved in destroying the earth. The gods had even created the sacred lakes Chakratirtha and Brahmatirtha at that time. Narada and the other sages created a new sacred pond called Devatirtha. Narada invited the gods and requested Ganesha's mother Parvati to send Ganesha. The rites were performed and hymns recited extolled Ganesha. Pleased by their devotion, Ganesha consented to remain at the site to help them conduct the rituals without any trouble. On this occasion, one more lake was also created and named as Ganesha-tirtha to fetch water to the temple. The same location is now called the Idagunji, where the Ganesh Temple was built by the devotees around 4th-5th century CE.

Central icon

The central icon of the Idagunji Temple dates to 4-5th century CE. The image of Ganesha in dvibhuja style, similar to that of the Gokarna Ganesha temple, nearby Idagunji. He has two arms and is standing on a stone slab. His right hand holds a lotus bud, and he holds a modak sweet in other hand. He wears a garland across the chest in the style of a yagnopavita (sacred thread). Ganesha is adorned with a necklace of small bells. A rat, the vahana or vehicle of Ganesha, always depicted alongside Ganesha, is not depicted in this image.

Worship

The Idagunji Temple is one of the prominent temples in South India, independently dedicated to Ganesha.

The Ganesha of Idagunji is the chief patron deity (Kuladevata) of the Havyaka Brahmins, who are Smarta by sect. Bandhis, a Dalit community of Karnataka, seek blessings of the deity, after conclusion of amicable marriage negotiations, for conduct of the marriage. The families of the bride and the groom visit the temple and perform the ritual of prasada keluvudu. A chit is placed on each of the legs of Ganesha and worship is performed. The falling of the chit of the right leg first is taken as a sign of divine approval to the marriage, however if the left chit falls first, an adverse verdict is inferred.

Idagunji is part of a temple circuit of six Ganesha temples along India's western coast. The circuit starts with Kasargod, Mangalore, Anegudde, Kundapura, Idagunji and Gokarna. Any person visiting with his family all the six temples, within one day between sunrise and sunset will receive special blessings.

The best puja offering that a devotee offers to Ganesha is garike grass(doorve) which is sold in the kiosks of the temple. Many other poojas can also be performed by the devotees.

Souvenirs
Masks made out of lavancha (sogade beru in Kannada language which is vetiver) are the souvenirs to carry as gifts from the temple. Lavancha or vetiver in the raw state gives out a pleasant scent if soaked in water and it has medicinal qualities.

See also
List of Ganesha temples

References

Ganesha temples
Hindu temples in Uttara Kannada district